Jacks Valley is a valley in the U.S. state of Nevada.

Jacks Valley was named after Jack Redding, an early settler.

References

Valleys of Douglas County, Nevada